Collaborative Fund is a venture capital firm focused on providing seed and early stage funding to technology companies.



Firm 
Founded in 2010 by Craig Shapiro, the firm is based in New York City, New York, and manages approximately $250 million of investor capital.

Partnerships 
In 2014 Collaborative Fund launched a $10 million joint investment vehicle with Line, a Japanese messaging service.

In early 2016 Collaborative Fund partnered with Sesame Workshop to form a $10 million joint fund, aimed at investing in startups focused on education, health and social welfare for children.

References 

Financial services companies established in 2010
Venture capital firms of the United States
2010 establishments in New York City